The Hotel Metropol Moscow is a historic hotel in the center of Moscow, Russia, built in 1899–1905 in Art Nouveau style. It is notable as the largest extant Moscow hotel built before the Russian Revolution of 1917, and for the unique collaboration of architects (William Walcot, Lev Kekushev, Vladimir Shukhov) and artists (Mikhail Vrubel, Alexander Golovin, Nikolai Andreev).

Since 2012, the hotel has been owned by Alexander Klyachin, who also is proprietor of the Moscow-based Azimut Hotels chain.

History
In 1898, Savva Mamontov and Petersburg Insurance consolidated a large lot of land around the former Chelyshev Hotel. Mamontov, manager and sponsor of Private Opera, intended to redevelop the area into a large cultural center built around an opera hall. Mamontov eventually hired Kekushev as a construction manager. Soon, Savva Mamontov was jailed for fraud and the project was taken over by Petersburg Insurance, omitting the opera hall that had originally been planned.

In 1901, the topped-out shell burnt down and had to be rebuilt from scratch in reinforced concrete. Kekushev and Walcot hired a constellation of first-rate artists, notably Mikhail Vrubel for the Princess of Dreams mosaic panel, Alexander Golovin for smaller ceramic panels and sculptor Nikolay Andreyev for plaster friezes. The hotel was completed in 1907. However, it is nowhere near Walcot's original design (Brumfiels, fig.56, compare to actual, fig.59-60).

A notable feature of the Metropol is "its lack of any reference to the orders of architecture ... a structural mass shaped without reference to illusionistic systems of support" (Brumfield). The rectangular bulk of the Metropol is self-sufficient; it needs no supporting columns. Instead, "Texture and material played a dominant expressive role, exemplified at the Metropole by the progression from an arcade with stone facing on the ground floor to inset windows without decorative frames on the upper floors" (Brumfield).

In 1918, the hotel was nationalized by the Bolshevik administration, renamed Second House of Soviets and housed living quarters and offices for the growing Soviet bureaucracy. Eventually in the 1930s it reverted to its original function as a hotel and in 1986-1991 was thoroughly restored by Finnish companies as part of Soviet-Finnish bilateral trade.

As of 2022, the Metropol has 365 rooms, each being different in its shape or decoration.

Apocrypha
Canadian businessman Aggie Kukulowicz was a hotel resident while brokering hockey's 1972 Summit Series between the Red Machine team and the first Team Canada.

The hotel is the setting of Amor Towles's 2016 novel, ''A Gentleman in Moscow.

Gallery

References

William Craft Brumfield, The Origins of Modernism in Russian Architecture, University of California Press, 1991 chapter 3, fig.56-60

External links

Hotel Metropol Moscow official website
Hotel Metropol Moscow official Azimut Hotels chain website

Hotels in Moscow
Hotel buildings completed in 1905
Hotel Metropol Moscow
Hotel Metropol Moscow
Hotel Metropol Moscow
Hotels established in 1907
Art Nouveau hotels
1907 establishments in the Russian Empire
Cultural heritage monuments of federal significance in Moscow